
Year 868 (DCCCLXVIII) was a leap year starting on Thursday (link will display the full calendar) of the Julian calendar.

Events 
 By place 

 Europe 
 King Charles the Bald meets his brother Louis the German at Metz. They agree to a partition of Lotharingia, which belonged to former emperor Lothair I (now in possession of his sons Lothair II and Louis II).
 Salomon, duke ('king') of Brittany, leads a joint campaign against the Loire Vikings. He is forced to defend southeastern Brittany unaided, and mobilizes levies raised at Poitiers to defeat the Vikings.
 Al-Andalus: The city of Mérida rises against the Umayyad rule. Emir Muhammad I regains control, and has the walls of the city destroyed. He supports the rival creation of Badajoz in retaliation.
 The County of Portugal is established around the town of Portus Cale (present-day Porto) by Vímara Peres, an Asturian nobleman, after the reconquest from the Moors of the region north of the Douro River.

 Britain 
 Alfred the Great marries Ealhswith (a daughter of Æthelred, known as Mucel, an ealdorman of the Gaini). He supports his brother Æthelred I, in his choice to form an alliance with Mercia.
 King Burgred of Mercia appeals to Æthelred I for help in resisting the Great Heathen Army. The Danes occupy Nottingham, and stay through the winter without any serious opposition.
 King Áed Findliath drives the invading Danes and Norwegians out of Ireland, after defeating them at the Battle of Killineery.

 Africa 
 September 15 – Ahmad ibn Tulun, a Turkish general, is sent to Egypt as governor, by the Abbasid caliph Al-Mu'tazz. He becomes the founder of the Tulunid Dynasty (until 905).
 Muslim Arab forces under Muhammad II, emir of the Aghlabid Dynasty (modern Tunisia), conquer the island of Malta and raid into the mainland of Italy.

 Asia 
 May 11 – The earliest extant printed book, an illustrated scroll of the Diamond Sutra ("Perfection of Wisdom"), unearthed at Dunhuang (Western China), is produced.

 By topic 

 Religion 
 Ratramnus, Frankish monk and abbot of Corbie Abbey, writes Contra Graecorum Opposita.

Births 
 Choe Eon-wui, Korean minister and calligrapher (d. 944)
 Muhammad ibn Dawud al-Zahiri, Muslim theologian (d. 909)
 Théodrate of Troyes, Frankish queen (d. 903)
 Xu Jie, Chinese officer and chancellor (d. 943)

Deaths 
 Ali al-Hadi, tenth Shia Imam
 Al-Jahiz, Afro-Muslim scholar and writer (b. 776)
 Bugha al-Sharabi, Turkish military leader
 Conwoïon, Breton abbot (approximate date)
 Minamoto no Makoto, Japanese prince (b. 810)
 Muzahim ibn Khaqan, Muslim governor
Stephania, wife of Adrian II
 Theotgaud, archbishop of Trier
 Yang Shou, chancellor of the Tang Dynasty
 Yu Xuanji, Chinese poet (or 869)

References